Édouard Hubert Scipion d’Anglemont (28 December 1798 – 22 April 1876) was a 19th-century French playwright, librettist and romantic poet.

Works 
1823: La Pacification de l’Espagne, ode
1823: Nouveau Chant français
1824: Louis XVIII, ode
1825: Odes légitimistes
1827: Berthe et Robert, poème en quatre chants
1832: Le Duc d’Enghien 
1835: Pèlerinage
1838: Westminster et le château de Windsor
1840: Les Euménides
1840: Sainte-Hélène et les Invalides
1841: Amours de France 
1860: Roses de Noël
1869: Les Pastels dramatiques 
1872: Résurrection de la Colonne
1875: Voix d'Arain
1875: La Horde bonapartiste
Theatre
1826: Le Cachemire, comedy in one act and in verse, with Jean-Pierre Lesguillon and Jean-Joseph Ader, Paris, Théâtre de l'Odéon, 16 December
1827: Tancredi, three-act opera, with Jean-Pierre Lesguillon, music by Rossini arranged by Lemière de Corvey, Théâtre de l'Odéon, 7 September
1831: Paul Ier, three-act historical drama in prose, with Théodore Muret, Théâtre de l'Ambigu-Comique, 27 December
Texts online
 Louis XVIII
 Berthe et Robert, poème en quatre chants
 Résurrection de la Colonne
 Sainte-Hélène et les Invalides
 Westminster et le château de Windsor
 Nouveau Chant français
 La Pacification de l’Espagne
 La Horde bonapartiste
 Tancrède, three-act opera

Bibliography 
 Germain Sarrut and Edme-Théodore Bourg, Biographie d’Édouard Hubert Scipion d’Anglemont, Paris, E.-T. Krabbe, 1841

Sources 
 Eugène Asse, Les Petits Romantiques, Paris, H. Leclerc, 1900, (p. 205-341)
 Gustave Vapereau, Dictionnaire universel des contemporains, Paris, Hachette, 1858, (p. 49)

19th-century French poets
19th-century French dramatists and playwrights
French opera librettists
Writers from Normandy
1798 births
1876 deaths